Tice Livingston James (December 14, 1914 – March 13, 1989), nicknamed "Winky", was an American Negro league shortstop between 1936 and 1946.

A native of Key West, Florida, James made his Negro leagues debut in 1936 with the Chicago American Giants, and played for the club again in 1941. He also played for the Memphis Red Sox and Cleveland Buckeyes, and finished his career with a short stint with the Indianapolis Clowns in 1946. James died in Wiggins, Mississippi in 1989 at age 74.

References

External links
 and Baseball-Reference Black Baseball stats and Seamheads

1914 births
1989 deaths
Chicago American Giants players
Cleveland Buckeyes players
Indianapolis Clowns players
Memphis Red Sox players
Baseball shortstops
Baseball players from Florida
People from Key West, Florida
20th-century African-American sportspeople